"FDT" ("Fuck Donald Trump") is a protest song by YG featuring Nipsey Hussle, and is the second single from the album Still Brazy. The song is a criticism of the policies of the Republican candidate in the 2016 US presidential election, Donald Trump, who would go on to win the election.

Recording
The track was recorded in about an hour, and was inspired by Hussle's positive experience of working with Mexican immigrants to the US. It begins with soundbites from several black protesters who were ejected from a Trump rally in Valdosta, Georgia. The track contains a sample of "Somethin' To Ride To (Fonky Expedition)" by The Conscious Daughters.

In April 2016, the LAPD shut down a video shoot for the song being filmed on the corner of Crenshaw Boulevard and 71st Street, Los Angeles following a tip-off. There were no arrests, and a police spokesman later said there was no evidence of violence. Footage from the police raid was included in the final video.

According to YG, the US Secret Service attempted to halt the album's release because of the lyrical content of this song, but were unsuccessful, though a portion of the track was "blanked" before release. YG considered dropping the track from the album, worrying it would not be released, but was persuaded by producer Steve-O Carless to keep it. The track as released has gaps where controversial lines were removed.

Reception
The track became increasingly popular throughout 2016. YG called his summer tour to promote Still Brazy the "Fuck Donald Trump Tour" and the song was remixed by G-Eazy and Macklemore, featuring new verses criticizing Trump's comments on banning Muslims from the US. Following the election, which saw Trump become president-elect, YG performed the song as the closing number in his set at the 2016 Camp Flog Gnaw Carnival to a positive reception.

The Los Angeles Times described "FDT" as, "the most prophetic, wrathful and unifying protest song of 2016."

In early 2019, YG announced he planned to record another Trump-related diss song as a follow up.

In October 2020, a 44-year-old Texas man was filmed punching an anti-Trump protester who was playing the "FDT" song outside of a convenience store in Denton, Texas. The man who threw the punch was arrested.

On November 7, 2020, the song topped the iTunes charts after Joe Biden defeated Trump in the 2020 United States presidential election.

Charts

Certifications

See also
 Donald Trump in music

References

External links
Lyrics of this song at Genius

 

2016 singles
2016 songs
2016 United States presidential election in popular culture
Def Jam Recordings singles
Nipsey Hussle songs
Protest songs
Songs about Donald Trump
Songs written by YG (rapper)
YG (rapper) songs
Songs written by Nipsey Hussle